Cyrus Dunham may refer to:

Cyrus Grace Dunham (born 1992), American writer and activist
Cyrus L. Dunham (1817–1877), American attorney and politician